The 1900–01 Welsh Amateur Cup was the eleventh season of the Welsh Amateur Cup. The cup was won by Wrexham Victoria who defeated Singleton & Coles 1-0 in the final, at The Racecourse, Wrexham.

First round

Second round

Third round

Fourth round

Semi-final

Final

References

1900-01
Welsh Cup
1900–01 domestic association football cups